Slow Burn is a 2000 drama film directed by Christian Ford and starring Minnie Driver, James Spader, Stuart Wilson, and Josh Brolin. It is a very loose adaptation of the 1899 novel McTeague by Frank Norris.

Plot
Trina (Driver) continues a family quest to find diamonds hidden deep in the desert long after her parents death. Her search comes to fruition when two escaped convicts (Spader and Brolin), having found the diamonds, stumble onto Trina's path. An old family friend (Wilson) watches events unfold from a distance.

Cast
 Minnie Driver as Trina McTeague
 James Spader as Marcus
 Stuart Wilson as Frank Norris
 Josh Brolin as Duster
 Chris Mulkey as Jacob McTeague
 Caprice Benedetti as Catalina McTeague

References

External links
 

2000 films
2000 crime drama films
Films scored by Anthony Marinelli
2000s English-language films